Hurley is a crater on Mercury, located near the south pole.  Its name was adopted by the International Astronomical Union (IAU) in 2013, after Australian photographer Frank Hurley.

Hurley has a crater floor that is in permanent shadow.  So do nearby craters Chao Meng-Fu (at the south pole), Lovecraft, and L'Engle.

References

Impact craters on Mercury